The Spain national under-16 football team represents Spain in international football for children under 16 and is controlled by the Royal Spanish Football Federation, which is the governing body for football in Spain.

Competitive record

FIFA U-17 World Cup record

UEFA European Under-17 Championship record

* Draws include knockout matches decided by penalty shootout.
** Gold background colour indicates first place finish. Silver background colour indicates second place finish. Bronze background colour indicates third place finish. Red border colour indicates tournament was held on home soil.

Player records

Top appearances 

Note: Club(s) represents the permanent clubs during the player's time in the Under-16s.

Top goalscorers 

Note: Club(s) represents the permanent clubs during the player's time in the Under-16s.

Former squads
2001 UEFA European Under-16 Football Championship squads - Spain
1994 UEFA European Under-16 Football Championship squads - Spain

See also
Spain national football team
Spain national under-23 football team
Spain national under-21 football team
Spain national under-20 football team
Spain national under-19 football team
Spain national under-18 football team
Spain national under-17 football team
Spain national under-15 football team
Spain national youth football team

References

External links
siemprecantera 
Spain under-16 at Soccer-Spain
Tournament archive at fifa.com
Tournament archive at uefa.com
UEFA U-16 European Championship at rsssf

European national under-16 association football teams
Football